The Spine Race is a winter ultramarathon  held over a distance of around  from Edale, England, to Kirk Yetholm, Scotland, along the Pennine Way. Participants are allowed seven days to complete the course. The race has been held annually since 2012. The Spine Fusion is a summer race run over the same route, introduced in 2017. The Spine Challenger and Spine Flare are shorter winter and summer races over the first  of the Spine Race route, to be completed in 60 hours.

History
The event was devised by Arctic expedition guides Scott Gilmour and Phil Hayday-Brown. The inaugural race took place in 2012 when there were only three finishers from a small field of eleven competitors.

The 2013 event was promoted as the Dare 2b Spine Race but later that year it was announced that Montane would take on sponsorship of the event.

In the 2014 and later editions, participants carried GPS trackers for safety reasons and so that the progress of the race could be publicly followed online as it took place. Starting in 2016, daily video summaries were made available during the race.

Due to the time of year and race location, the majority of the event takes place in darkness. Snow, ice and strong winds are common. Severe weather was a factor in 2015 in particular, when racers were held at various checkpoints for significant amounts of time until it was considered safe for them to continue. Some competitors that year were also redirected between Middleton and Alston to avoid sections of high ground, including Cross Fell, during the inclement weather.

Participants wear or carry mandatory clothing and equipment over the full course and have access to an additional drop bag which is transported along the route for them and made available at checkpoints. Individual support crews for the runners were allowed in the past but from 2018 were no longer permitted.

The 2019 race received considerable media attention when the overall win was taken by British women's fell running champion Jasmin Paris.

Runners were taken by motorised transport between Bellingham and Byrness during the 2022 race due to many trees on or near that section of the route having been blown down during Storm Arwen.

Route
The Spine Race closely follows the Pennine Way but involves some slight deviations such as the access to and departure from the Hebden checkpoint. The runners are not required to complete the out-and-back section of the Way to The Cheviot. Racers generally follow the lower-level Pennine Way route option on the approach to Kirk Yetholm rather than the alternative over White Law.

The timing points and approximate distances of the main checkpoints along the route are as follows.

Results
The winners have been as follows.

Spine Challenger
The Spine Challenger is a shorter version of the Spine Race and follows the first  of the route, starting in Edale and finishing in Hawes, or in neighbouring Hardraw in some years. It starts the day before the full Spine Race. There is also a version of the Challenger specifically for members of mountain rescue teams.

The winners of the Spine Challenger have been as follows.

Summer Spine Race
The Summer Spine Race was formerly known as Spine Fusion and is a summer version of the Spine Race, covering the full route from Edale to Kirk Yetholm.

The winners have been as follows.

Spine Flare
The Spine Flare is a summer version of the Spine Challenger.

The winners have been as follows.

Notes

References

External links

Ultramarathons in the United Kingdom
Pennines